Paul Breyne (born 10 January 1947) is a Belgian politician who served as Governor of West Flanders between 1997 and 2012. He is a member of Christen-Democratisch en Vlaams.

References 

1947 births
Living people
21st-century Belgian politicians
Christian Democratic and Flemish politicians
Politicians from Ypres
Governors of West Flanders
Grand Crosses with Star and Sash of the Order of Merit of the Federal Republic of Germany